Atru railway station is a railway station in Baran district, Rajasthan. Its code is ATRU. It serves Atru town. The station consists of 2 platforms. Passenger, Express, and Superfast trains halt here.

References

Railway stations in Baran district
Kota railway division